WHYY-FM (90.9 MHz, "91 FM") is a public radio station licensed to serve Philadelphia, Pennsylvania. Its broadcast tower is located in the city's Roxborough neighborhood at  while its studios and offices are located on Independence Mall in Center City, Philadelphia. The station, owned by WHYY, Inc., is a charter member of National Public Radio (NPR) and contributes several programs to the national network.

History
WHYY signed on the air on December 14, 1954, owned by the Metropolitan Philadelphia Educational Radio and Television Corporation.  It was the first educational station in Philadelphia. The transmitter, originally located at 17th and Sansom Streets in Philadelphia, was donated by Westinghouse Broadcasting. In 1957, it added a sister television station, WHYY-TV on channel 35. 

In 1963, WHYY-TV moved from channel 35 in Philadelphia to the stronger channel 12 in Wilmington, Delaware. At the time, Federal Communications Commission (FCC) regulations did not allow co-owned television and radio stations to share the same base callsign if they were licensed in different markets. Philadelphia and Wilmington, then as now, are separate radio markets (though 90.9, like most major Philadelphia stations, has long claimed Wilmington as part of its primary coverage area), though they have long been a single television market. As a result, the radio station was forced to change its call sign to WUHY.  90.9 FM regained its original call sign in 1983 after the FCC eased this restriction.

When NPR was formed in 1970, the station became a charter member and was one of the 90 stations that carried the initial broadcast of All Things Considered.

Programs produced

 NPR: Fresh Air with Terry Gross, a Peabody Award-winning weekday magazine of contemporary arts and issues, is one of public radio's most popular programs. 5.3 million people listen to the broadcast on 640 National Public Radio stations across the country, as well as in Europe on the World Radio Network. The program originated in 1975 as a local show before going national in 1987.
 Radio Times With Marty Moss-Coane, a daily hour-long program that tackles a wide range of issues.
 You Bet Your Garden (1998-2018), an organic gardening call-in talk show hosted by Mike McGrath that moved to WLVT in Bethlehem in 2018.
 Voices in the Family with Dr. Dan Gottlieb, psychologist and family therapist, along with guest experts, opens the line to callers to discuss issues that affect individuals and society, with special focus on family issues. Its executive producer is Maiken Scott, WHYY's Behavioral Health Reporter.
 The Pulse is a show that focuses on stories at the heart of health, science and innovation in the Philadelphia region. The show is hosted by WHYY's Behavioral Health Reporter Maiken Scott and distributed on the Public Radio Exchange.

Format change
Until 1990, WHYY served the region as a non-commercial station with a format that featured mostly classical music with some jazz and folk music. The management decision to establish a news/talk radio format was a departure from the classical music that most public radio stations were programming. The format switch left the privately owned WFLN as the only Philadelphia classical station and resulted in protests from many of the station's listening audience who were among WHYY's major contributors. After WFLN's new owners also abandoned the classical format in the late 1990s, Temple University's WRTI (90.1 FM) began programming classical music during the day to serve the displaced listeners.

CEO controversy
Controversy erupted in the summer of 2007 when station Chief Executive Officer Bill Marrazzo was cited by the watchdog group Charity Navigator as the highest paid CEO in all of public broadcasting.

In an August 2007 article, popular Philadelphia Inquirer columnist Karen Heller called for a boycott of WHYY. And in September 2007 an anonymous group of WHYY employees sent an open letter to Marrazzo, the Inquirer, the Philadelphia Daily News and Philadelphia magazine, accusing him of "a serious lack of understanding when it comes to creating ... a healthy workplace" and assailing his salary as "excessive and inappropriate." The five-page letter concluded with a call for Marrazzo to resign.

New Jersey expansion and controversy

On June 6, 2011, the New Jersey Public Broadcasting Authority agreed to sell five FM stations in Southern New Jersey to WHYY. The purchase was made through an anonymous one-million dollar grant and a non-cash agreement that included scholarships for students and teachers. The five stations were previously the southern portion of the New Jersey Network's statewide radio service.

The transaction was announced by Governor Chris Christie, as part of his long-term goal to end state-subsidized public broadcasting. The governor's critics maintained that scrapping New Jersey Network effectively ended all non-commercial statewide news coverage. It was also noted that the sale eliminated a source of legislative oversight frequently critical of the Christie administration.

WHYY assumed control of the stations through a management agreement on July 1, 2011, pending FCC approval for the acquisition. At that point, the stations began to simulcast WHYY-FM programming. The five stations are:

The stations all operate at relatively low power due to the crowded state of the noncommercial end of the FM dial in the northeastern United States. They primarily serve areas of southern New Jersey not covered by the main WHYY-FM signal, which itself operates at a relatively modest 13,500 watts. However, their combined footprint extends WHYY-FM's coverage from Berks County to the Jersey Shore.

On November 2022, WHYY began to reduce its New Jersey radio footprint by announcing that it would sell WNJB-FM to non-profit Christian Broadcast, The Bridge of Hope, Inc., which owns WKNZ in Harrington, Delaware. The sale was approved by the FCC and was later completed on February 2023.

On March 2023, WHYY also announced that it would sell WNJS-FM to the Bux-Mont Educational Radio Association which owns WRDV for $110,000. The sale to the station is subject to FCC Approval.

Billy Penn 
In April 2019 WHYY acquired local news web site Billy Penn (billypenn.com). At its 2014 founding, the site was conceived as a "mobile-first" site packaging local news for millennials. The purchase was compared to New York public radio station WNYC buying the Gothamist in February 2018.

Signal note
WHYY-FM is short-spaced to two other Class B stations:

 WETA in Washington, D.C. operates on the same frequency as WHYY-FM. The distance between the stations' transmitters is 128 miles as determined by FCC rules; the minimum distance between two Class B stations operating on the same channel is currently 150 miles. Additionally, WETA is a grandfathered “superpower” station, with an analog effective radiated power (ERP) of 75,000 watts. This exceeds the maximum analog ERP limit allowed for a Class B FM station.

 WFUV in New York City operates on 90.7 MHz, a first adjacent channel to WHYY-FM, and the distance between the stations' transmitters is 92 miles; the minimum distance between two Class B stations operating on first adjacent channels is currently 105 miles.

See also
 WHYY-TV

References

External links
 

HYY-FM
NPR member stations
Radio stations established in 1954
NPR member networks
1954 establishments in Pennsylvania